Hayatullah Khan may refer to:

Hayatullah Khan Durrani (born 1962), Pakistani cave explorer and mountaineer
Hayatullah Khan (journalist) (1976–2006), Pakistani journalist, murdered after reporting on the Taliban in 2006
Hayatullah Khan (Taliban leader), Taliban leader and spokesmen